In the mythological writings of William Blake, Enion is an Emanation/mate of Tharmas, one of the four Zoas, who were created when Albion, the primordial man, was divided fourfold. She represents sexuality and sexual urges while Tharmas represents sensation. In her fallen aspect, she is a wailing woman that is filled with jealousy. After the Final Judgment, she is reunited with Tharmas and able to experience an idealised sexual union.

Character
Enion is an Emanation, a female essence that is part of one of the divine Four Zoas. She is connected to Tharmas, who is the western and water based Zoas. He is connected to the senses and to the body, and her aspect is sexual desire. It is possible that her name comes from letters used in Enitharmon's name, with Tharmas being the middle portion of the name and hers representing the rest. Tharmas represents a unity within the spirit, and, when Enion is separated from him, she becomes the image of the earth mother. Enion has the power to generate the world. She and Tharmas were able to get along until innocence was taken from their relationship. She wanted to join with Tharmas but could not because of the idea of sin. Along with creating nature, she creates the "Circle of Destiny", which removes Tharmas's aspect of speech by shutting the Gate of the tongue.

After her separation from Tharmas, she becomes jealous and attacks other Emanations from his being even though they are her own children. Enion then separates the free aspects, called Jerusalem, from Tharmas's soul and hides from him in what becomes the material world, known as Ulro. She is able to use her power to separate from Tharmas his Spectre, which is a selfish, sexual form of Tharmas. From the union of the two comes Los and Enitharmon, which represents Imagination and Poetry. However, Los and Enitharmon flee. Enion is outraged and believes that the world is cruel. Tharmas allows Enitharmon to hide with him for protection, but Enion soon finds and kills her.

Enion is reduced to wailing and singing. Her song has the power to either create madness or to bring about an apocalypse. The actual song describes lost innocence and the nature of pleasure. Enion can do nothing but wander and be disconnected from Tharmas, even though Tharmas keeps trying to return to her. Albion, the original essence, resigns from power as he was dying because of her wailing, and Urizen, who replaces him, is terrified when he witnesses her. The wailing is used by both Los and Enitharmon to divide Urizen from his Emanation, Ahania. In a human form, Tharmas continues to seek her but he can only hate her. Eventually, they reconcile enough for Tharmas to ask her to come back, but Enion had dissolved into just a wailing voice. During the Final Judgment, Tharmas and Enion are reunited, and the two become like children that are able to enjoy each other sexually. They form an idealistic sexual unity. Eventually, Enion is restored to her form and she joins the rest at Albion's feast.

Appearances
Enion is introduced in Vala, or The Four Zoas as her division from Tharmas begins the work. The work describes their sexual and moral struggles. She is a jealous lover and eventually hides from him. She is depicted as a wailing voice and is the essence of sexuality, jealous, and physical passions. In Milton a Poem, she is described as a wandering, wailing voice. In Jerusalem The Emanation of the Giant Albion, Enion is questioned as being dominant, and the birth of Los and Enitharmon changes. In the new version, Los protests about the action, but he cannot prevent it.

Notes

References
 Bloom, Harold. The Visionary Company. Ithaca: Cornell University Press, 1993.
 Damon, S. Foster. A Blake Dictionary. Hanover: University Press of New England, 1988.

William Blake's mythology